Psychroserpens burtonensis is a species of psychrophilic, yellow-pigmented bacteria. It is non-motile and nutritionally fastidious. Its type strain is ACAM 188.

References

Further reading
Dworkin, Martin, and Stanley Falkow, eds. The Prokaryotes: Vol. 7: Proteobacteria: Delta and Epsilon Subclasses. Deeply Rooting Bacteria. Vol. 7. Springer, 2006.
Whitman, William B., et al., eds. Bergey's manual® of systematic bacteriology. Vol. 5. Springer, 2012.

External links
LPSN
WORMS entry
Type strain of Psychroserpens burtonensis at BacDive -  the Bacterial Diversity Metadatabase

Flavobacteria
Psychrophiles
Bacteria described in 1997